South Kenton is a station in Kenton, north-west London. The station is served by suburban services operated by London Underground on the Bakerloo line and London Overground on the Watford DC line. In the Bakerloo line, the station lies between Kenton and North Wembley stations. It is located between The Link in the Sudbury Court Estate of North Wembley, and Windermere Grove in Kenton, in the Wembley postal area.

History

The station opened on 3 July 1933 with access from both sides of the railway via a footbridge to the single island platform serving only the Euston-Watford DC line; this footbridge (which started at the bottom of the embankment) was later replaced by a pedestrian tunnel, cutting out a long climb for passengers entering the station. The station designed by the architect William Henry Hamlyn was built in a more modern "concrete and glass" style construction including a "streamlined" waiting room rather than the brick and woodwork LNWR stations elsewhere on the DC line.

The station today
The station is an island platform and Bakerloo line train doors are not level with it. Therefore, there is a downward step to the train from the platform. The ticket office is at platform level and occupies the north end of the streamlined 1933 building. It is one of the very few stations served by London Underground which has no ticket gates and due to the restrictive layout here there are no plans for these to be installed in the immediate future. There is no wheelchair access.

Services

There are 6tph on the Bakerloo line heading southbound towards Central London and Elephant & Castle and northbound to Harrow & Wealdstone.

There are 4tph on the London Overground service to London Euston southbound and to Watford Junction northbound.

Connections
London Buses route 223 serve the station.

References

External links

Bakerloo line stations
Tube stations in the London Borough of Brent
DfT Category E stations
Railway stations in the London Borough of Brent
Former London, Midland and Scottish Railway stations
Railway stations in Great Britain opened in 1933
Railway stations served by London Overground
Kenton, London
William Henry Hamlyn buildings